Delfin or Delfín may refer to:

People
Delfin (surname)
Delfin N. Bangit (1955–2013), Filipino general
Delfín Benítez Cáceres (1910–2004), Paraguayan football player and coach
Delfin Castro (born 1925), Filipino general
Delfin Chamorro (1863–1931), Paraguayan educator
Delfín Fernández Martínez (born 1948), Spanish musician
Delfín Gallo (1845–1889), Argentine politician
Delfin Jaranilla (1883–1980), Filipino lawyer and judge
Delfin Lorenzana (born 1948), Filipino government administrator
Delfín Mosibe (born 1992), Equatoguinean football player
Delfín Quishpe (born 1977), Ecuadorian singer

Places
Delfin Albano, Isabela, Philippines
Delfin Basin, Mexico

Military
  a submarine launched in 1912
  a submarine launched as HMS Vengeful in 1944, renamed on transfer to Greece in 1945
  ('Dolphin'), the first combat-capable Russian submarine
 , a submarine launched in 1972 and now converted into a museum ship
 Aero L-29 Delfín, a Czechoslovakian military trainer aircraft

Other uses
Delfin (EP), an EP by Serbian band Smak
Delfin Limited, an Australian property developer
Delfín S.C., an Ecuadorian football club

See also
Delphin (disambiguation)
Dolfin (disambiguation)
Dolphin (disambiguation)